Ron Stone may refer to:
Ron Stone (American football) (born 1971), American football player
Ron Stone (Australian footballer) (born 1945), Australian football player
Ron Stone (baseball) (born 1942), Major League outfielder
Ron Stone (bishop) (born 1938), Anglican bishop of Rockhampton
Ron Stone (New Zealand footballer) (1913–2006), New Zealand international football (soccer) player
Ron Stone (music industry executive) (born 1944), American personal manager and musician's advocate
Ron Stone (reporter) (1936–2008), American television reporter